The 1991 Chicago Bears season was their 72nd regular season and 21st postseason completed in the National Football League (NFL). The Bears returned to the playoffs for a second consecutive season as one of three NFC Wild Cards, finishing with an 11–5 record and in second place in the NFC Central. They were beaten, however, by the Dallas Cowboys in their first playoff game. This was Mike Ditka's last playoff game as a head coach.

Offseason

NFL draft

Staff

Roster

Regular season

Schedule

Standings

Playoffs

References

External links
 1991 Chicago Bears at Pro-Football-Reference.com

Chicago Bears season, 1991
Chicago Bears seasons
Bear
1990s in Chicago
1991 in Illinois